Mama, There's A Man in Your Bed is a 1989 light French comedy built around an interracial romance. Its French title is Romuald et Juliette (also the title of its British DVD release). The film was directed by Coline Serreau, of Three Men and a Cradle fame and stars Daniel Auteuil and Firmine Richard.

Cast
Daniel Auteuil - Romuald Blindet
Firmine Richard - Juliette Bonaventure
Pierre Vernier - Blache
Maxime Leroux - Cloquet
Giles Privat - Paulin
Catherine Salviat - Francoise Blindet
Muriel Combeau - Nicole
Alexandre Basse - Benjamine
Aissatou Bah - Félicité
Mamadou Bah - Désiré
Pascal N'Zonzi - Douta
Marina M'Boa Ngong - Claire
Sambou Tati - Aimé
Alain Tretout - Vidal
Fabienne Chaudat - Madame Salgado
Emil Abossolo-Mbo - Husband 2
José Garcia - Worker
Carole Franck - The Receptionist
Lionel Abelanski - The sick guy
Nicholas Serreau - Fonctionnaire HLM

References

External links
Mama, There's A Man in Your Bed ; IMDb.com
allmovie/synopsis
Aveleyman.com

1989 films
1980s French-language films
1989 romantic comedy films
French romantic comedy films
Films about interracial romance
Films directed by Coline Serreau
1980s French films